The Metropolis of Chicago is a metropolis of the Greek Orthodox Church, part of the Greek Orthodox Archdiocese of America, in the North-Central Midwest, United States, with its see city of Chicago.  The mother church of the Metropolis is Annunciation Cathedral in Chicago.   

On , the Holy Synod of the Ecumenical Patriarchate of Constantinople unanimously elected Nathanael Symeonides as the metropolitan of Chicago, succeeding Metropolitan Iakovos.

The Metropolis of Chicago consists of thirty-four parishes in Illinois, with another twenty-four parishes in Wisconsin, Minnesota, Iowa, northern Indiana, and eastern and central Missouri. The general offices of the Greek Orthodox Metropolis of Chicago are located in Elk Grove Village, Illinois.

History
The Metropolis of Chicago itself traces its explicit roots to 1923, when Rev. Philaret Ioannides became the city’s first Greek Orthodox bishop. Nearly twenty years later, Chicago became the "2nd Diocesan District" of the Greek Orthodox Archdiocese of North & South America. That district would continue to coordinate the ecclesial growth of this major immigrant, industrial, and rail center on the southwestern shores of Lake Michigan.

A number of distinguished bishops served the diocesan community, including Meletios, Ezekiel and the late Timotheos of Rodostolon. Each brought unique talents to Chicago's Greek Orthodox and larger communities. This episcopal ministry excelled with the singular dedication of Chicago's Metropolitan Iakovos, who ministered for thirty eight years. A studied and accomplished liturgist, Athens-born Metropolitan Iakovos made a profound imprint upon the character of the Midwest’s Greek Orthodox communities.

On , a new chapter in the life and history of the Metropolis of Chicago was inaugurated with the ordination of its next archbishop, Metropolitan Nathanael of Chicago, at the Archdiocesan Cathedral of the Holy Trinity. A dedicated and energetic servant of the Greek Orthodox Archdiocese of America, the faithful of the Metropolis are poised to enter into a new period of growth under the guidance of her new metropolitan.

The majority of metropolis parishes are concentrated in the Chicago metropolitan area, where immigrants arrived as early as the 19th century. Hence, the older parishes are to be found primarily in the older Midwestern industrialized cities, while newer congregations have followed demographic patterns, locating in suburban and even rural/missionary contexts. Within recent decades, Metropolis churches have been built integrating traditional Byzantine forms; earlier structures, in contrast, often were acquired from other faith groups.

Parishes

Illinois 
Aurora St. Athanasios Church
Champaign Three Hierarchs Church
Chicago
Annunciation Cathedral
Assumption Church
Holy Trinity Church
St. Andrew Church
St. Basil Church
St. Demetrios Church
St. George Church
St. Nicholas Albanian Church
DeKalb St. George Church
Decatur Annunciation Church
Des Plaines St. John the Baptist Church
East Moline Assumption Church
Elgin St. Sophia Church
Elmhurst St. Demetrios Church
Glenview Ss. Peter & Paul Church
Hegewisch Assumption Church
Homer Glen Assumption Church
Joliet All Saints Church
Justice Holy Cross Church
Kankakee Annunciation Church
Libertyville St. Demetrios Church
Lincolnshire Ascension of Our Lord Church
Niles Holy Taxiarchai-St. Haralambos
Oak Lawn St. Nicholas Church
Palatine St. Nectarios Church
Palos Heights St. Spyridon Church
Palos Hills Ss. Constantine & Helen Church
Peoria All Saints Church
Rock Island St. George Church
Rockford Ss. Constantine & Helen Church
Springfield St. Anthony Church
Swansea Ss. Constantine & Helen Church
Westchester Holy Apostles Church

Indiana
Hammond  St. Demetrios Church
Merrillville Ss. Constantine & Helen Church
Schereville St. George Church
South Bend St. Andrew Church
Valparaiso St. Iakovos Church

Iowa
Cedar Rapids St. John the Baptist Church
Des Moines St. George Church
Dubuque St. Elias the Prophet Church
Mason City Holy Transfiguration Church
Sioux City Holy Trinity Church
Waterloo St. Demetrios Church

Minnesota
Duluth Twelve Holy Apostles Church
Minneapolis St. Mary Church
Rochester Holy Anargyroi Church
St. Paul St. George Church

Missouri
Columbia St. Luke the Evangelist Church
St. Louis St. Nicholas Church
Town and Country Assumption Church

Wisconsin
Appleton St. Nicholas Church
Fond du Lac Holy Trinity Church
Madison Assumption Church
Milwaukee Annunciation Church
Racine Dormition of the Theotokos Church
Sheboygan St. Spyridon Church
Wauwatosa Ss. Constantine & Helen Church

Monasteries
Illinois Holy Transfiguration
Wisconsin St. John Chrysostomos

References

Dioceses of the Greek Orthodox Archdiocese of America
Greek-American culture in Chicago
Eastern Orthodoxy in Illinois